Narumi Kurosaki was a Japanese woman who went missing and was allegedly murdered in the French city of Besançon. Her Chilean ex-boyfriend, Nicolás Zepeda, who she had met in Japan and with whom she had separated two months before her disappearance, is considered by the investigators as the main suspect. He was sentenced to 28 years in prison for murder on April 12, 2022. The case had international repercussions, since the judicial process involved authorities from countries on three different continents: France (Europe) where the events occurred, Japan (Asia), the victim's country of origin and Chile (South America), the accused's country of origin.

A retrial began on February 21 after Zepeda appealed his sentence, but it had to be temporarily suspended as Zepeda's lawyer, Maître Antoine Vey, dropped the case.

Background 

Narumi Kurosaki (黒崎 鳴海, Kurosaki Narumi, born 23 July 1995 – disappeared 5 December 2016) grew up in a family of five, with her parents and two younger sisters, Honami and Kurumi. From 2011 to 2014, she attended Tokyo Metropolitan Kokusai High School. Narumi was 21 years old when she arrived in France on 26 August 2016 to study at the University of Franche-Comté in the city of Besançon. There, she took French classes at the Center for Applied Linguistics before being joining the Faculty of Economics in January. Narumi lived in a student room on the second floor of the Théodore Rousseau residence hall located on the La Bouloie campus.

Nicolás Humberto Zepeda Contreras (born 11 December 1990) was born into a Chilean family of three children. His father, Humberto Zepeda, is one of the main executives of the telecommunications provider Movistar. His mother, Ana Luz Contreras, is an engineer who worked as a secretary to Senator Francisco Huenchumilla at the time and also worked in the human resources department of the municipality of La Serena. Nicolás grew up with his twin sisters, Belén and Josefa, in Temuco in the south of the country, attending Colegio Centenario until 2008 and obtaining his high school diploma. In 2009, the family moved to Antofagasta and later to La Serena. Nicolás studied administrative sciences at the University of Chile. After the case became public, various members of Zepeda's family were harassed by journalists.

In 2014, Nicolás arrived in Japan to continue his studies, where he met Narumi during October at a party held on the campus of the University of Tsukuba. They began a romantic relationship in February 2015, and the couple traveled to Chile from September 6 to October 1, 2015, where Nicolás introduced her to his family as his partner. Nicolás left Japan in 2015 at the end of his university year but returned on April 12, 2016, to look for work. According to statements by Nicolás himself, Narumi officially ended her romantic relationship with him shortly after arriving in France on October 6. Zepeda left Japan on October 9. In Besançon, Narumi met new people, including Arthur del Piccolo, a student at the Higher National School of Mechanics and Microtechnology, who became her new boyfriend.

Events 
On Sunday, 4 December, 2016, Narumi went to her dance class as usual, leaving at around 4:00 PM. In the night between Sunday and Monday, at around 3:20 AM, about fifteen students from the residence where Narumi was staying heard screams followed by a thud. Rachel Hope, a British student, then messaged a friend: "I'm scared, I heard a noise like someone was being killed." Another student, Nabil Drissi, went out into the hallway to investigate, but was not able to determine the source of the sounds. The following day, Narumi's classmates were concerned about her absence from class, stating that the Japanese girl had never missed a class.

Over the next few days, Narumi's family and friends received messages from her phone via text and social media claiming that she had a problem with her passport and needed to go to the Japanese consulate in Lyon. On 6 December, her bank card was used to purchase a one-way train ticket to Lyon. However, all the train passengers who occupied seats close to the one assigned on her ticket claimed not to have seen any young women resembling Narumi. Other messages reached her relatives in the following days, indicating that she had a new boyfriend and that she was going alone. No more messages were received after 12 December.

On December 14, the Center for Applied Linguistics in Besançon alerted the police, who entered Narumi's room on 15 December in the late afternoon. Upon quickly realizing the seriousness of the situation, investigators initially suspected Arthur, Narumi's new boyfriend. During his interrogation, Del Piccolo mentioned Narumi's former Chilean lover, Nicolás Zepeda Contreras, whom he presented to investigators as a jealous and possessive man who had even hacked into his Facebook account. Initially, this information was not considered decisive given the geographical distance. However, thanks to the geolocation of Narumi's phone, investigators discovered that she was in a restaurant on the night of 4 December and that the bill had been paid with a Chilean bank card.

In fact, on the night of Sunday, 4 December, Narumi Kurosaki and Nicolás Zepeda Contreras had dinner at La Table de Gustave restaurant, in the small town of Ornans located about twenty kilometers south of Besançon. A camera recorded them leaving the restaurant at 9:57 PM, and then, at 10:58 PM., other surveillance footage recorded their arrival at Narumi's college dorm. According to Zepeda's own testimony, the "screams" were in reality Narumi's moans, as the couple allegedly had sex for two and a half hours after arriving at her dorm. Zepeda was the last person to see Narumi alive. As of June 2022, Narumi's body has not been found.

Investigation

Narumi's room inspection 
The police entered room 106, Narumi's, on December 15 at 5:31 p.m. and found it to be perfectly tidy, although Narumi's friends pointed out that she was usually quite messy. Specifically, her only coat was found at the scene even though winter had begun, along with her laptop and wallet containing 565 euros in cash. As the police took inventory of Narumi's belongings, they realized that a blanket, a suitcase, her passport, and her phone were missing. The fingerprints taken from a cup, after analysis, showed that they belonged to Nicolás Zepeda Contreras. From the DNA reconstructed from the fingerprints, investigators found traces of the suspect on a water bottle, a T-shirt, the walls, the bathroom floor, and the edge of the sink. The French police also found samples of the victim's blood on the emergency door, which Zepeda used as he exited the building.

Digital data analysis 
In response to Nicolás asking her to delete some of his contacts on Facebook, Narumi wrote him an SMS dated 5 September stating: "I will never delete Arthur". On September 7, 2016, Nicolás Zepeda published a video on Dailymotion in which he talks about his relationship with Narumi in disturbing terms: "She has to pay a little for what she has done and accept that she cannot continue making these kinds of mistakes with someone who loves her." He also specified in this video that "certain conditions are applicable during her stay in France, and others are applicable forever. If she cannot follow these conditions for two weeks, within two weeks, I will enforce these conditions with immediate effect."

Witness testimonies 
Juan Felipe Ramírez Contreras, the cousin of Nicolás Zepeda who spent five days with him in Barcelona before his return to Chile, was questioned by Catalan police on January 24, 2017. He provided several worrying details about their conversations during this stay. Nicolás Zepeda had hidden his meeting with Narumi in Besançon, explaining that he had simply come to Europe to participate in a conference in Geneva. Zepeda also asked Ramírez, who was a medical student, about death by suffocation. Ramírez also revealed that he was surprised by a phrase used by Nicolás in which he referred of Narumi in the past tense: "Narumi really liked the sea."

Judicial process

Extradition of the suspect 
On Monday, May 18, 2020, the Chilean Supreme Court of Justice authorized the extradition of Nicolás Zepeda Contreras to France. Zepeda had been under house arrest in Viña del Mar since the end of June. On July 23, 2020, he was transferred by the Chilean Investigative Police (PDI) to Santiago de Chile airport to be handed over to the French authorities. After a flight to Paris-Charles de Gaulle airport that landed in the late morning of July 24, he was notified of the Interpol Circular of December 26, 2016. He was then transferred by car to Besançon and arrived at around 4:40 PM. Zepeda was brought before the investigating judge who announced his murder charge, and then before the liberties and detention judge. Finally, he was imprisoned in the Besançon pre-trial detention center.

Trial against Nicolás Zepeda 
The trial against Nicolás Zepeda Contreras, called the "Great Trial" by the French Ministry of Justice, began on 29 March 2022 in the Cour d'Assises (court) of Doubs, Besançon. Due to the international scope of the case, the trial had an exceptional schedule: all exchanges were subject to simultaneous translation by a team of six interpreters, three for Japanese and three for Spanish. Three clocks displayed the time in France, Japan and Chile to account for the time difference. Many witnesses from abroad were heard by videoconference, including ten from Tokyo, two from Santiago de Chile, and one from Scotland. In addition to the main courtroom, two other rooms were open for journalists and the public to follow the debates broadcast on a giant screen.

Zepeda was defended by Maître Jacqueline Laffont, a lawyer from the Paris Bar Association who notably defended the former President of the Republic Nicolas Sarkozy during a wiretapping case, Alexandre Benalla in the Benalla affair, and former Minister Nicolas Hulot in the investigation of sexual assault charges. She was assisted by her associate Maître Julie Benedetti. 

Narumi's family was represented by Sylvie Galley, a lawyer from the Besançon bar association. Maître Randall Schwerdorffer, a lawyer from the Besançon bar association known for his role as defense attorney in the famous Daval and Frédéric Péchier cases, joined the civil party representing Arthur del Piccolo, Narumi's boyfriend at the time of Narumi's disappearance. The Advocate General was Étienne Manteaux, Prosecutor General of Besançon since September 2018. The process was led by Matthieu Husson, President of the Criminal Court. Humberto Zepeda and Ana Luz Contreras, the parents of Nicolás Zepeda Contreras, as well as Taeko and Kurumi Kurosaki, the mother and sister of Narumi Kurosaki, were present in Besançon to follow the two weeks of trial and testify there.

One crucial piece of evidence presented during the trial was Zepeda's blogspot page, where he often shared stories about his relationship presented as fictional works. Zepeda was also active on various online forums such as Smule, last.fm, and DeviantArt, where he posted various Japanese-styled drawings. French authorities claimed that intercepted private messages between Narumi and Zepeda on social media showed Zepeda to be jealous and possessive. During the trial, Zepeda pleaded innocence, claiming that he did not kill Narumi.

On April 12, 2022, Zepeda was found guilty and sentenced to 28 years in prison. He is expected to serve the first 15 years in France, after which he could be extradited to Chile to serve the remaining 13 years.

Retrial 
On February 21, a retrial started, as Zepeda appealed his sentence, which was planned to conclude on 10 March 2023,  but it had to be temporarily suspended as Laffont dropped the case, leaving Zepeda with no lawyer. This time, Zepeda's defense team hopes to include various witnesses who claim to have been Narumi alive after the supposed date of death, including Said Neremi, who claims she went into hiding with the help of a French soldier, allegedly having seen her on 11 December 2016.

See also 
 List of solved missing person cases

References 

2020s missing person cases
Deaths by person in France
Female murder victims
Incidents of violence against women
Missing person cases in France
Murder convictions without a body
Violence against women in France
2016 murders in France
2010s missing person cases